The discography of Swedish pop singer/songwriter/musician Eric Saade consists of 5 studio albums, 2 extended plays, 1 live album, 27 singles, and 15 promotional singles. He is also a featured artist on four singles released by other artists. Saade was a member of the pop band What's Up! The band released the 2007 album In Pose peaking at number 40 on Sverigetopplistan, the official Swedish music chart. The band had two charting singles, "Go Girl!" in 2007 and "If I Told You Once" in 2008 peaking at numbers 5 and 16 consecutively on the Swedish charts. Masquerade, Saade's solo debut studio album, was released in May 2010. The album peaked at number 2 on the Swedish Albums Chart, the album includes the singles "Sleepless" and "Break of Dawn". Saade participated in Melodifestivalen 2010 in the 2nd semi-final on 13 February 2010 at the Göransson Arena, Sandviken with the song "Manboy" it achieved third place in the national final on 13 March 2010. Saade Vol. 1, Saade's second studio album, was released in June 2011. The album peaked at number 1 on the Swedish Albums Chart. He represented Sweden in the Eurovision Song Contest 2011 in Düsseldorf, Germany in the second semi-final on 12 May 2011 with the song "Popular". Qualifying for the Final as one of the top 10 on the night, it was also later revealed that he had won the semi-final with the highest number of points. In the Final, Saade came in third place, making Eric Saade the most successful Swedish act in Eurovision since 1999 when Sweden won. The album also includes the single "Hearts in the Air". Saade Vol. 2, Saade's third studio album, was released in November 2011. The album peaked at number 1 on the Swedish Albums Chart, the album includes the single "Hotter Than Fire". Forgive Me, Saade's fourth studio album, was released in August 2013. The album peaked at number 1 on the Swedish Albums Chart, the album includes the singles "Coming Home", "Boomerang" and "Flashy".

In Melodifesitvalen, Saade made his comeback for Melodifestivalen with his entry "Sting", which finished at the fifth place. He released his second extended play, Saade. The second single from the EP, "Wide Awake" reached top ten in Russia. In 2017, Saade participated in the reality television show, Så mycket bättre. The compilation album from the show, Så mycket bättre – Tolkningarna was released in December 2017 and peaked at number 44 in Sweden.  His fifth album and first Swedish-language album, Det svarta fåret was released in 2020. Although the album failed to chart in Sweden, it managed to yield one top forty hit, "Postcard". In 2021, Saade again participated in Melodifestivalen, and finished at the second place behind Tusse. Saade's entry, "Every Minute" reached number four in Sweden.

Albums

Studio albums

Live albums

Compilation albums

Extended plays

Singles

As lead artist

As featured artist

Promotional singles

Music videos

See also
 Sweden in the Eurovision Song Contest 2011
 Sweden in the Eurovision Song Contest

References

Notes

Sources

Pop music discographies
Discographies of Swedish artists